Allan R. Webb (January 22, 1931 – July 18, 2011) was an American football player, coach, and executive. He played professional football in the National Football League (NFL) for the New York Giants from 1961 to 1965 as a defensive back and halfback. Webb played college football at Arnold College.

Early years
Webb was born in Washington, D.C. and attended Ansonia High School in Ansonia, Connecticut. He led the state of Connecticut in 1947 with 21 touchdowns and 21 extra points and earned all-state honors. He then attended Arnold College in Milford, Connecticut, where he played college football.

Professional playing career
Webb began his professional football career with the Montreal Alouettes of the Canadian Football League (CFL). He later played in the NFL for the New York Giants from 1961 to 1965. He appeared in 48 NFL games. He intercepted seven passes.

Coaching and executive career
After retiring as a player, Webb went into coaching, serving has head coach for the Long Island Bulls of the Atlantic Coast Football League (ACFL). He rejoined the New York Giants as a scout in 1972 and was an assistant coach for the team from 1974 to 1978. Webb was the director of pro personnel for the Cleveland Browns from 1979 to 1982 and work in the pro personnel department for the San Francisco 49ers from 1983 until his retirement in 1995. He died on July 18, 2011, at the age of 80, from heart failure.

References

External links
 

1931 births
2011 deaths
American football defensive backs
American football halfbacks
Bridgeport Purple Knights football players
Cleveland Browns executives
New York Giants coaches
New York Giants players
New York Giants scouts
San Francisco 49ers executives
People from Ansonia, Connecticut
Coaches of American football from Connecticut
Players of American football from Connecticut
Players of American football from Washington, D.C.
Burials at Cypress Lawn Memorial Park